The Sukhoi Su-6 was a Soviet ground-attack aircraft developed during World War II. The mixed-power (rocket and piston engines) high-altitude interceptor Su-7 was based on the single-seat Su-6 prototype.

Design and development
Development of the Su-6 began in 1939, when the Sukhoi design bureau began work on a single-seat armoured ground-attack aircraft. An order for two prototypes was placed on 4 March 1940, and on 1 March 1941 flight testing of the first prototype was begun by test pilot A.I. Kokin.

The flight tests indicated that the Su-6 was superior to the Ilyushin Il-2 in nearly all performance categories, however its engine exceeded its age limit before testing could be completed, and no further Shvetsov M-71 engines were available.

The second prototype flew only in January 1942 because the OKB had to be evacuated after the start of the Great Patriotic War. It was armed with two 23 mm cannon, four machine guns and ten rails for aerial rockets. Test results were very favorable, and the AFRA Scientific Research Institute recommended the acquisition of a small production batch for testing under front-line conditions. A draft resolution for the production of 25 aircraft was prepared, however unfortunately for Sukhoi, it was never officially issued.

Meanwhile, combat experience with single-seat Il-2s demonstrated the need for a rear gunner. The third prototype was therefore designed with the second crewman at the expense of bomb load (decreased from 400 kg/881 lb to 200 kg/440 lb), and was fitted with a more powerful M-71F engine. Official tests revealed that the two-seat Su-6 had a 100 km/h (54 kn, 62 mph) greater top speed than the Il-2, although with a considerably smaller payload. When the troublesome M-71 was canceled, Sukhoi was directed to utilize the liquid-cooled Mikulin AM-42 engine. When flight tests began on 22 February 1944, the re-engined Su-6 proved inferior to the Ilyushin Il-10 using the same engine thanks to the additional 250 kg (551 lb) of armor required to protect the liquid-cooled engine and the lower power output of the AM-42 compared with M-71F.

Although the Su-6 never entered production, in 1943 Pavel Sukhoi was awarded the Stalin Prize of the 1st Degree for the development of the aircraft.

Su-7

As an experiment, the basic single-seat Su-6 design was converted into a mixed-power high-altitude interceptor named Su-7 (the name was reused in the 1950s for a supersonic fighter-bomber). The armor was removed and the fuselage was of all-metal construction. Power came from a Shvetsov ASh-82FN piston engine with two TK-3 turbochargers in the nose and a Glushko RD-1-KhZ rocket engine in the tail. The piston engine produced 1,380 kW (1,850 hp), while the rocket engine utilized kerosene and nitric acid for fuel and generated 2.9 kN (600 lbf) of thrust for up to 4 minutes. Armament consisted of three 20 mm ShVAK cannon with 370 rounds of ammunition. The sole Su-7 was completed in 1944. Test flights demonstrated a top speed of 510 km/h (275 kn, 315 mph) at 12,000 m (39,370 ft) without the rocket motor, and 705 km/h (380 kn, 440 mph) with the rocket. In 1945, the rocket motor exploded during flight testing, killing the pilot and destroying the aircraft.

Variants
A
 The initial design for the Su-6.
S
The second prototype with various modifications.
SA (modified)
The SA with 2 x OKB-16  Cannon and 2x  ShKAS machine guns.
S2A
The Su-6 fitted with a second cockpit with a rear-firing  Berezin UBT machine gun. Testing revealed better performance and armour than the Il-2, but despite recommendations, production was not carried out due to the M-71 engine not entering production.

Operators

Soviet Air Force

Specifications (Su-6(SA) 2nd prototype)

See also

References

Su-06
1940s Soviet attack aircraft
Single-engined tractor aircraft
Low-wing aircraft
Abandoned military aircraft projects of the Soviet Union
World War II Soviet ground attack aircraft
Aircraft first flown in 1941